Jason Sherlock (born 10 January 1976 in Dublin) is an Irish former Gaelic footballer who played at senior level for the Dublin county team between 1995 and 2010. He played most of his club football for Na Fianna in Glasnevin in the northern suburbs of Dublin. Sherlock was on the Na Fianna team which won the Dublin Championship in 1999, 2000 and 2001. In January 2007, he transferred to the nearby St. Oliver Plunkett GAA.

Early life
Sherlock was born and raised in Finglas on the northside of Dublin, the son of an Irish mother and a father from Hong Kong. He was educated at St. Vincent's C.B.S.

Playing career
Sherlock made his debut for Dublin in their All-Ireland Senior Football Championship winning year, 1995, at the age of 19. He was responsible for crucial scores in the All-Ireland semi-final and final against Cork and Tyrone respectively.

Sherlock also played professional football for UCD and signed for Shamrock Rovers in August 1998 becoming the club's top goalscorer in his first season. While at UCD he scored 31 League of Ireland goals and made one appearance for the Republic of Ireland U21s.

During this time he played basketball before eventually deciding in 2003 to concentrate on football only; since then he has regained his place on the Dublin team. He was part of the 2005 Leinster Senior Football Championship-winning side that defeated Laois, scoring a total of two points in the final. He finished the 2005 Leinster and All-Ireland Championship with a total of one goal and six points compared to his total of one goal and one point in the 2005 National Football League. He finished the 2006 National Football League with one point due to a lack of first-team football. He scored the vital goal in the 2006 Leinster Final against Offaly and his experience was a telling factor throughout the game.

He was nominated for an All Star Award for his 2006 performances in the half forward line. Sherlock was rumoured to be seeking a transfer from Na Fianna to local rivals Plunkett's. Sherlock is now playing with St Oliver Plunketts.

Sherlock was on Dublin's winning team for the 2008 O'Byrne Cup winning team which defeated Longford in the final. He proved to be the hero of the game by coming on as a substitute and scoring two goals to steal victory against Longford in the dying moments of the game.

Dublin went on to win the Leinster championship for the fourth successive time, but were defeated by Tyrone in the All-Ireland quarter-final. Following Dublin's shattering defeat at the hands of Kerry in the All-Ireland quarter-final on 3 August 2009, Sherlock was thinking about hanging his boots up but Pat Gilroy persuaded him to stay. Despite his planned retirement Sherlock was considering giving the 2010 inter-county championship another go. In May 2010, Gilroy decided to call time on Sherlock after spending 15 years on the panel. 

Sherlock announced his retirement from football on 1 June 2013.

National League appearances

Championship appearances

Coaching career
In November 2022, Sherlock was announced as performance coach of the Westmeath senior footballers, working under the management of Dessie Dolan.

Honours
League of Ireland First Division
 UCD 1994/95
League of Ireland First Division Shield
 UCD 1994/95
Leinster Senior Cup (football): 2
 UCD 1994/95, 1995/96

References

External links
 GAA Info Profile

1976 births
Living people
Association football forwards
Dublin inter-county Gaelic footballers
Gaelic footballers who switched code
Gaelic football forwards
Irish people of Hong Kong descent
Irish sportspeople of Asian descent
League of Ireland players
Na Fianna Gaelic footballers
Republic of Ireland association footballers
Republic of Ireland under-21 international footballers
RTÉ television presenters
Shamrock Rovers F.C. players
St Oliver Plunketts/Eoghan Ruadh Gaelic footballers
20th-century Irish people
21st-century Irish people
University College Dublin A.F.C. players
Westmeath county football team
Winners of one All-Ireland medal (Gaelic football)
People educated at St. Vincent's C.B.S., Glasnevin